Mona Løseth (born 11 April 1991) is a Norwegian alpine skier. She was giant slalom Junior World Champion in 2010. Her elder sisters Lene and Nina are also alpine skiers at international level. In a World Cup competition in slalom in Flachau in January 2010 all three sisters qualified for the final.

She represented Norway at the 2010 and 2014 Winter Olympics.

References

External links
 
 
 

1991 births
Living people
Norwegian female alpine skiers
Olympic alpine skiers of Norway
Alpine skiers at the 2010 Winter Olympics
Alpine skiers at the 2014 Winter Olympics
Sportspeople from Ålesund